The Big Ten softball tournament is the conference championship tournament in softball for the NCAA Division I Big Ten Conference.  The winner of the tournament receives the conference's automatic bid to the NCAA Division I softball tournament.

History
The Big Ten softball tournament began in 1982 and then took a hiatus until the tournament was reinstated in 1995. The tournament was held from 1995–2008 until the Big Ten switched back to using the regular season champion for the automatic qualifier to the NCAA tournament. The Big Ten reinstated the conference tournament in 2013 and has been held at the conclusion of the regular season ever since. Tournaments held in 1982 and 1995–2003 used a double elimination format. Tournaments from 2004–2008 and 2013–present have used a single elimination format.

The inaugural tournament in 1982 included Indiana, Iowa, Michigan, Michigan State, Minnesota, Northwestern, and Ohio State, which were the only Big Ten schools with varsity softball programs at the time.  Penn State started Big Ten play in 1992 after a few years of independence and playing in the Atlantic 10 Conference. Purdue began their program in 1995, followed by Wisconsin in 1996 and Illinois in 2001.  Nebraska left the Big 12 Conference and joined the Big Ten for the 2012 season, and then Maryland and Rutgers came on board in 2015 from the Atlantic Coast Conference and the Big East Conference, respectively.

When USC and UCLA join the Big Ten Conference for the 2024-2025 school year, UCLA will begin league play for the 2025 season.  As of 2022, USC does not have a softball program nor any intention of starting one up after performing a study around 2002.

Champions

By year

By school

See also
List of Big Ten Conference softball champions

References

External links

 
Recurring sporting events established in 1982